The First Croatian beach soccer league, also known as Prva HLNP is the top division in the Croatian Beach Soccer league.
The league was inaugurated in 2021 under the supervision of the Croatian Football Federation and Beach Soccer Worldwide.

Background
The Executive board of the HNS, on the proposal of the Commission for Futsal and Beach Soccer and the competition commission pursuant to Article 43 and Article 44, paragraph 6 of the Statute, on 16 August 2021 passed a decision that the registered clubs in the beach soccer competition for competition year 2021–22, play a pilot project of the first Croatian championship in beach soccer called "First Croatian beach soccer league" (First HLNP). Six clubs have been registered and matches are played as series of three tournaments, with a single point system through six rounds in the period of August and September.

On August 12, 2021, it was announced that participating tams are KNP Beasal Gorovo (Opatija), KNP Pula (Pula), KNP Fusio (Zagreb), KNP Pješčana oluja (Zagreb), KNP Umag (Umag) and KNP Varadero (Zagreb).

The first two tournaments were played at Stella Maris sport center in Umag on 14th and 21st August, while last tournament was played on Sand arena (Croatian: Pješčana arena) in Velika Gorica on 4th September.

Champions

2021 season

Group stage

Classification matches

Source: HNS 

Source: HNS, SportNews.hr

See also
 Euro Beach Soccer League

References

External links
Official website 

Football leagues in Croatia
National beach soccer leagues